Hemicladus buqueti is a species of beetle in the family Cerambycidae. It was described by Tavakilian, Touroult and Dalens in 2010. It is known from Guyana.

References

Calliini
Beetles described in 2010